Jacob Tome (August 13, 1810 – March 16, 1898) was an American banker, philanthropist, and politician  who died as one of the richest men in the United States. He was the first millionaire of Cecil County, Maryland, and an accomplished philanthropist, giving money to colleges, churches, and schools, including establishing the Tome School.

Early life
Jacob Tome was born on August 13, 1810, in Hanover or Manheim Township in York County, Pennsylvania, to Christina (née Badger) and Christian Thom. At the age of 16, he worked for a farmer in York County; 15 months later, he became a superintendent of fisheries on Stony Island on the Susquehanna River. In 1830, he worked for a manufacturer of tinware in Marietta, Pennsylvania, for two years, and then became a teacher in Elizabethtown, Pennsylvania.

Career

Business career
In 1833, he moved to Port Deposit, Maryland, to work at Boggs' Hotel. He moved to Philadelphia for a short time to take up bookkeeping, but  returned to Port Deposit in 1834.

In 1834, he and David Rinehart, a Marietta banker and lumber dealer, founded the Tome & Rinehart lumber company, which prospered and would last until 1853. In 1849, he formed a partnership with the owners of the steamboat Portsmouth and Captain Masen L. Weems to establish the Baltimore and Fredericksburg Steamboat Company. In 1855, he and John and Thomas C. Bond formed the Bond Brothers & Co. lumber company . Through Bond Brothers & Co. and his own personal accounts, he invested in timber lands in Pennsylvania, Michigan, and Wisconsin. With his nephew, J.W. Reynolds, he formed J. Tome & Co., a fertilizer and agriculture equipment company.

He served as the president of the Baltimore and Susquehanna Steamboat Company; as a director of the Conowingo Bridge Company, as a director of the Philadelphia, Wilmington and Baltimore Railroad, and as a director of the Columbia and Port Deposit Railroad. He was also a large stockholder in the Delaware Railroad Company.

Political career
He was a Union Republican and a supporter of Abraham Lincoln during the American Civil War. In 1863 and 1864, he was elected to represent Cecil County in the Maryland State Senate. In 1865, he was elected as the chairman of the Senate finance committee. In 1871, he was nominated as the Union Republican candidate for Governor of Maryland, losing to William Pinkney Whyte.

Banking career
In 1850, Tome obtained a charter for the Cecil Bank at Port Deposit. The bank quickly grew and became a national bank. In 1868, he purchased the Elkton National Bank. In 1865, he opened a bank the National Bank in Fredericksburg, Virginia, which his nephew John Creswell became president of. He owned stock in a number of Baltimore banks and a majority stake in the Citizens' National Bank of Hagerstown, Maryland.

Personal life

About 1850, Tome erected a fine, substantial home and in the 1870s he remodeled the structure.  This renovation in the grand Second Empire Style, greatly enlarged the mansion. It had a mansard roof and wrought iron balconies, along with a substantial tower, which housed Tome's bank and office. In 1948, fifty years after his death, the "palatial three-story granite block home," was raised to make way for a swimming pool operated by the Port Deposit Lions Club.

Tome married Caroline M. Webb, an aunt of John Creswell, on December 6, 1841. Together, they had three children, but they all died in infancy. She died on February 16, 1874. He married Evalyn S. Nesbitt on October 1, 1884. Evalyn Tome was the richest woman in the state of Maryland; after his death, she married Joseph Irwin France, a Senator and U.S. presidential candidate.

Philanthropy

Tome Memorial Methodist Church
He built the Tome Memorial Methodist Church in Port Deposit in 1887. The church was closed on October 1, 2018.

Dickinson College
Tome was a trustee of Dickinson College in Carlisle, Pennsylvania, from 1883 to 1898. He pledged $25,000 in 1883 for the construction of its first science building, the Tome Scientific Building.

Jacob Tome Institute

The Jacob Tome Institute was incorporated in 1879, and the school was first opened for students on September 17, 1894. His wife, Evalyn Tome, served as the president of the board of trustees. In the last week of his life, Jacob Tome worked with Senators Austin Crothers and Henry Dodson to give Maryland financial supervision over the school.

Death
Tome died of pneumonia on March 16, 1898, at his home in Port Deposit at the age of 87. He was buried at Hopewell Cemetery in Port Deposit. At his death, he owned about $89 million (about $ today).

Legacy
Maryland Route 276 in Cecil County was named the Jacob Tome Memorial Highway in his honor in 1961.

References

External links

1810 births
1898 deaths
American bankers
People of Maryland in the American Civil War
People from York County, Pennsylvania
People from Port Deposit, Maryland
Republican Party Maryland state senators
19th-century American politicians
19th-century American philanthropists
19th-century American railroad executives
Businesspeople in timber
Businesspeople from Pennsylvania
Businesspeople from Maryland
Philanthropists from Pennsylvania
Philanthropists from Maryland